Haplomitrium minutum is a species of liverwort from New Zealand.

References

Plants described in 1987
Flora of New Zealand
Calobryales